The Sānatsujātiya refers to a portion of the Mahābhārata, a Hindu epic. It appears in the Udyoga Parva (book), and is composed of five chapters (Adhyāya 41–46). One reason for the Sānatsujātiya'''s importance is that it was commented upon by Adi Shankara, the preeminent expositor of Advaita Vedanta, and one of the most important Hindu sages, philosophers, and mystics.

Buitenen wrote that "The Sānatsujātiya had a minor reputation as a philosophical classic.... The text certainly deserves more study than it has received" (p. 182). He also wrote that

The Sānatsujātiya should probably be best approached as a brief, late-upaniṣadic text that very early attracted to itself, by way of appendix, commentary, and continuation, other texts that were considered to be of the same inspiration.... Its core seems to be the triṣṭubh verses of the beginning, in which the problem of death is addressed. This is followed, in ślokas, by reflections on brahman and wisdom, on the twelve vices and twelve virtues, and on brahmacarya. It ends with a mystical hymn on the manifestations of the Supreme... with the refrain: "The yogins behold the sempiternal blessed Lord." (p. 182)
Synopsis of Sānatsujātiya
King Dhṛtarāṣṭra has been conversing with his half-brother Vidura, who has been responding to his requests for various kinds of counsel.

Ch. 41: King Dhṛtarāṣṭra asks for more information. Vidura replies that he, as born from a Shudra woman, must not speak of secret matters relating to Atman but one who has taken birth as a Brahmin, if he states these secret matters, is not censured by the devatas. Therefore these matters may be spoken by the eternal sage Sanatsujāta. Vidura then invokes Sanatsujāta by meditating on him. When Sanatsujāta appears, Vidura requests that he dispel Dhṛtarāṣṭra's doubts.

Ch. 42: Dhṛtarāṣṭra asks Sanatsujāta why he teaches that death does not exist. Sanatsujāta replies that distraction equals death, and elaborates.

Ch. 43: Sanatsujāta continues, explaining that  Veda (scriptures) cannot save someone from evil, but can lead to better rebirth. There are many scriptures, but one truth, on which one should meditate, which gives knowledge of brahman.

Ch. 44: Sanatsujāta continues, explaining the need for brahmacarya (self-restrained behaviour) and a guru (spiritual teacher).

Ch. 45: Sanatsujāta describes the state of the yogin (realised person) in hymn-like language. A continuing refrain is "The yogins behold the sempiternal blessed Lord" (p. 292). Other affirmations in this chapter include "No one beholds him with his eye, but they who with wisdom, mind and heart gain knowledge of him have become immortal" (p. 292), and "If one sees oneself in all creatures yoked to their various tasks, why should he worry any more?" (p. 294), and
"My soul is the place, my soul is the birth,
I'm the ageless foundation the Vedas declare"
(p. 294)

Editions
Johannes Buitenen's (1978) translation of the Mahābhārata contains a summary (p. 285) and translation (pp. 285–294) of the Sānatsujātiya (partly available online via Google book preview)
Kashinath Trimbak Telang (1882) translated the Sānatsujātiya (freely/fully available online – see External links), which appeared in volume 8 of the Sacred Books of the East series edited by Max Müller.  The volume was reprinted in a 2001 edition.

References

External links
The Bhagvadgita with the Sanatsugatiya and Anugita Vol.8, The Sacred Books of the East. Translated by Kashinath Trimbak Telang (full text online)
Müller's Introduction (p. 135), and related translation (p. 149) of Sanatsujatiya  (partially online)
S. N. Sastri's translation of the Sanatsugatiya''  (online). Includes romanised Sanskrit based on ITRANS, plus commentary "Based on the bhAshya of SrI Sankara bhagavatpAda" (accessed 22 March 2010).
Parallel Sanskrit and Romanized Sanskrit, freely viewable at sacred.texts.com – Book 5, chapter: 41, 42, 43, 44, 45

Hindu texts
Mahabharata
Sanskrit texts